The discography for American hip hop musician Fiend.

Albums

Studio albums

Independent albums

Extended plays

Collaboration albums

Soundtrack albums

Mixtapes

Compilation albums

Singles

As lead artist

As featured artist

References

Discographies of American artists
Hip hop discographies